Derry Gowen (1 February 1933 – 6 December 2017) was an Irish hurler and Gaelic footballer, Gaelic Athletic Association administrator, referee and selector.

Playing career

Gowen played as a juvenile in the first North Cork Hurling Championship in 1946. He won minor hurling and football North Cork Championships with St. Patrick's, Fermoy and also won a Junior Hurling Championship with the club.

Coaching career

Gowen was a selector when the Cork minor football team won their very first All-Ireland MFC title in 1961. He later served as a selector with the Avondhu divisional senior football and hurling teams and was also senior hurling team trainer when Avondhu won the 1966 Cork SHC title. Gowen was also a selector with the Cork senior football team when they won the All-Ireland SFC title in 1973.

Administrative career

Gowen began his career as administrator when he served as secretary of the St. Patrick's juvenile club from 1950 to 1961. He also served as secretary and vice-chairman of the Fermoy adult club. Gowen was elected chairman of the North Cork Divisional Board in 1960, a position he held for over 25 years. During his tenure a successful divisional under-21 football competition was held, eventually leading to the inauguration of Munster-wide inter-county under-21 championships in both codes. He was also the founder of Scór in North Cork in 1969 before it was formally organised nationally in 1970. Gowen gave nearly 20 years service to the Cork County Board at various times between 1964 and 1987, during which time he held the offices of PRO, treasurer, vice-chairman, chairman and Central Council delegate. He served a further three years as President.

Death

Gowen died on 6 December 2017, aged 84.

Coaching honours

Avondhu
Cork Senior Hurling Championship: 1966

Cork
All-Ireland Senior Football Championship: 1973
Munster Senior Football Championship: 1973, 1974
All-Ireland Minor Football Championship: 1961
Munster Minor Football Championship: 1961

References

1933 births
2017 deaths
Chairmen of county boards of the Gaelic Athletic Association
Cork County Board administrators
Dual players
Fermoy Gaelic footballers
Fermoy hurlers
Irish funeral directors
Gaelic football selectors
Gaelic games club administrators
Hurling selectors
Irish auctioneers
People from County Cork